Johannes Staune-Mittet (born 18 January 2002) is a Norwegian professional racing cyclist, who currently rides for UCI Continental team . He is due to join UCI WorldTeam  in 2024.

Major results

2019
 1st  Time trial, National Junior Road Championships
 8th Overall Grand Prix Rüebliland
 9th Overall Tour du Pays de Vaud
2020
 2nd Time trial, National Junior Road Championships
2021
 1st Prologue (TTT) Tour Alsace
 4th Overall Ronde de l'Isard
1st Stage 3
 4th Overall Tour of Małopolska
1st  Young rider classification
 10th Trofeo Piva
 10th Liège–Bastogne–Liège Espoirs
2022
 1st  Overall Ronde de l'Isard
1st  Young rider classification
1st Stages 1 & 2a (TTT) 
 2nd Road race, National Under-23 Road Championships
 2nd Overall Tour de l'Avenir
 3rd Overall Oberösterreich Rundfahrt
1st   Young rider classification
 3rd G.P. Palio del Recioto
 5th Overall Alpes Isère Tour
 6th Liège–Bastogne–Liège Espoirs
 10th Overall Istrian Spring Trophy

References

External links
 

2002 births
Living people
Norwegian male cyclists